The Great Darling Anabranch, commonly called the Darling Anabranch, is an anabranch and ancestral path of the Darling River in the lower Murray-Darling basin in the Far West and Riverina regions of New South Wales, Australia.

Course and features

The Darling Anabranch contains archaeological cultural material and evidence of Aboriginal occupation. The Darling Anabranch is a naturally ephemeral system. After the completion of the Menindee Lakes scheme in the 1960s the system was managed as a permanent water supply for stock and domestic water use for adjacent landholders. A series of 17 weir pools were replenished with an annual replenishment flow, most of which evaporated. Over the 40 years of this flow management there was a decline in the health of the system, including poor water quality, decreased numbers of native fish and a decline in aquatic vegetation.

In 2007 a pipeline was constructed along the length of the Darling Anabranch to supply water to adjacent landholders. The Darling Anabranch was returned to an ephemeral system, with the removal of most structures within the channel, and the first dry phase for over four decades.

Initial results from a ten-year monitoring program have showed a marked ecological response to the restoration of the Darling Anabranch. Monitoring began in September 2010 at the breaking of the 'millennium drought', and detected a strong vegetation response including significant increases in riparian tree condition and in the condition of Lignum, a keystone species on the floodplains of the Murray-Darling Basin. The return of the Darling Anabranch to an ephemeral system also increased native fish diversity, and the system is thought to be crucial to maintaining the Murray-Darling Basin native fish community through provision of important habitat and food resources for juvenile life stages during times of flood.

See also

 Menindee Lakes
 Rivers of New South Wales

References

External links
 
 
 

Darling River
Rivers in the Riverina
Far West (New South Wales)